Lawrence North High School is a public high school in Indianapolis, Indiana, United States. The school was founded in 1976 and graduated its first class in 1978. Lawrence North is one of two high schools in the Metropolitan School District of Lawrence Township, the other one being Lawrence Central High School.

Academics

Enrollment
As of the 2019–20 school year, Lawrence North has an enrollment of 2,619 students. The student population is mostly African-American, followed equally by White and Latino. Thirteen percent of the students are involved in special education, ten percent qualify for English language learner support, and fifty-four percent qualify for free or reduced price lunch. The teachers, however, are seventy-seven percent white, and most of them have more than twenty years of teaching experience.

Awards and recognition
Lawrence North is recognized by the Indiana Department of Education as a Four-Star School, the highest honor that body can confer. It is also fully accredited by the North Central Association of Colleges and Schools.

Programs
Lawrence North offer 23 Advanced Placement courses, 38 dual credit courses, and houses an International Baccalaureate program, which was started in July 2003. It is also distinctive for being the only school in the district that is designated as a K-12 Spanish Language Immersion Program, a program recently recognized as an International Spanish Academy by Spanish Ministry of Education. Vocational courses are offered in neighboring McKenzie Center for Innovation and Technology. In addition, other World Languages program like French, German, and American Sign Language are also offered.

Extracurricular activities

Athletics 
Currently, it offer ten sports programs for both boys and girls, as well as several club and intramural teams. The Wildcats is a member of the Metropolitan Interscholastic Conference, a member conference of Indiana High School Athletic Association. They have won 14 state-level championships to date.

Lawrence North is a household name in Indiana high school boys basketball. They have won one national, four state, six regional, 17 sectional, and 16 conference titles under guidance of Jack Keefer, one of Indiana's most legendary basketball coach who had managed the program since its establishment in 1976. Shooting guard Brad Leaf led all Marion County, Indiana, scorers as a senior at Lawrence North in 1978 with a 25.5-point average, with a single-game high of 38 points.

The first state title came in 1989, when the team was led by Eric Montross. The next three titles came in a row on 2004, 2005, and 2006, guided by future NBA players Greg Oden and Mike Conley, Jr. The program has also produced 13 Indiana All-Stars. Keefer is the first coach from Indiana to be named National High School Coach of the Year by USA Today, Sports Illustrated and the National High School Coaches Association in 2006, and inducted into the Indiana Basketball Hall of Fame in 2007. He is one of eight high school coaches in Indiana history to have 700 or more victories, and in 2016 the gymnasium was renamed in his honor.

Marching Band 
Lawrence North's band program was merged with its Lawrence Central counterpart to form Marching Pride of Lawrence Township in 2014. It currently has more than 250 members, divided into various program such as marching band, color guard, winter guard, concert band, jazz band, and pep band. They are selected to participate in 2017 Rose Parade in Pasadena, California.

Student publication 
The main publication of the school is North Star, a student-run newspaper that is published ten times a year. There is also yearbook program LYNX, video news program Cat's Eye, and literary magazine.

Other activities 
Other Lawrence North clubs and organizations including Model United Nations, National Honor Society, Academic Team, Drama Club, Speech and Debate, Inside/Out, Spanish Honor Society, Show Choir, Chess Club, Bilingual Newsletter, Performance Dance Team, International Club, Lynx (Yearbook), Ski and Snowboarding and Principal's Advisory Council.

Notable alumni
Steve Bellamy – Sports and media entrepreneur, founder of The Tennis Channel and The Ski Channel
Eddie Casiano – Puerto Rican basketball player, current coach of Puerto Rico national basketball team
Mike Conley, Jr. – NBA player for Utah Jazz
Nick Hardwick – Former NFL center for the San Diego Chargers
Kenny Irwin Jr. – Former NASCAR driver, killed in crash on 2000
Felisha Johnson – Ranked 14th at the 2016 Summer Olympics in women's shot put
Caleb Jones – American football for the Green Bay Packers
Forrest Landis – Former child actor, best known for his role as Mark Baker in Cheaper by the Dozen 1 & 2
Scott Leonard – Frontman of the music group Rockapella
Brad Leaf – American-Israeli basketball player for Hapoel Galil Elyon and Maccabi Tel Aviv of the Israel Premier League 
Christine Montross – Psychiatrist and writer
Eric Montross – Former NBA player for the Boston Celtics, Dallas Mavericks, New Jersey Nets, Philadelphia 76ers, Detroit Pistons and Toronto Raptors
Greg Oden – Former NBA player for the Miami Heat and Portland Trail Blazers
Ashley Spencer – Bronze medalist at the 2016 Summer Olympics in women's 400 metres hurdles
Tiara Thomas – Singer-songwriter and record producer
Nolan Watson – MLB player for the Kansas City Royals

References

See also
 List of high schools in Indiana

Schools in Indianapolis
Educational institutions established in 1976
Public high schools in Indiana
International Baccalaureate schools in Indiana
1976 establishments in Indiana